The sieges of Berwick were the Scottish capture of the town of Berwick-upon-Tweed on 6 November 1355 and their subsequent unsuccessful siege of Berwick Castle, and the English siege and recapture of the town in January 1356. In 1355 the Second War of Scottish Independence had been underway for over 22 years. After a period of quiescence the Scots, encouraged by the French who were fighting the English in the Hundred Years' War, assembled an army on the border. In September a truce was agreed and much of the English army left the border area to join King Edward III's campaign in France.

In October the Scots broke the truce, invading Northumbria and devastating much of it. On 6 November a Scottish force led by Thomas, Earl of Angus, and Patrick, Earl of March, captured the town of Berwick in a pre-dawn escalade. They failed to capture the castle, which they besieged. Edward returned from France and gathered a large army at Newcastle. Most of the Scots withdrew, leaving a 130-man garrison in Berwick town. When the English army arrived the Scots negotiated a safe passage and withdrew. Edward went on to devastate a large part of southern and central Scotland. He was only prevented from worse depredations by his seaborne supplies not arriving due to bad weather.

Background

The First War of Scottish Independence between England and Scotland began in 1296, when Edward I of England stormed and sacked the Scottish border town of Berwick-upon-Tweed as a prelude to his invasion of Scotland. More than 32 years of warfare followed, with Berwick being recaptured by the Scots in 1318. The disastrous English campaign of Stanhope Park brought Isabella of France and Roger Mortimer, regents of the newly-crowned 14-year-old King Edward III, to the negotiating table. They agreed to the Treaty of Northampton with Robert Bruce in 1328 recognising Scotland as an independent nation. 

Edward never accepted the validity of the treaty and by 1333 England and Scotland were at war again when Edward besieged Berwick, starting the Second War of Scottish Independence. The Scots felt compelled to attempt to relieve the town. A Scottish army 20,000 strong attacked the 10,000 English and suffered a devastating defeat at the Battle of Halidon Hill. Berwick surrendered the next day. The Hundred Years' War between England and France commenced in 1337 and in 1346 Edward led an English army across northern France, winning the Battle of Crécy and besieging Calais. Encouraged by the French king, John II, the Scots invaded England with a large army, certain that few English troops would be left to defend the rich northern English cities. The Scots were decisively beaten at the Battle of Neville's Cross and their king, David II, was captured. The Scottish threat receded and the English were able to commit fully to the war with France.

Berwick
Berwick, on the North Sea coast of Britain, is on the Anglo-Scottish border, astride the main invasion and trade route in either direction. In the Middle Ages it was the gateway from Scotland to the English eastern march. According to William Edington, a bishop and chancellor of England, Berwick was "so populous and of such commercial importance that it might rightly be called another Alexandria, whose riches were the sea and the water its walls". Prior to its capture in 1333 it was the most successful trading town in Scotland, and the duty on wool which passed through it was the Scottish Crown's largest single source of income.

After it was sacked in 1296 Edward I replaced Berwick's old wooden palisade with stone walls. These were considerably improved by the Scots in 1318. The wall to the south-west was further protected by the River Tweed, which was crossed by a stone bridge and entered the town at a stone gatehouse. There were three further gates. The circumference and complexity of the defences necessitated a large garrison. Berwick Castle was to the west of the town, separated by a broad moat; this made the town and castle independent strongholds. Some sources state that in 1355 the town's and castle's defences were in good repair, while others hold that they had been ill maintained. The castle was overtopped in places by the town walls, and difficult to defend if the town was not also held; because of this, when the town of Berwick fell to the Scots in 1318 the castle was subsequently captured within a few days.

Prelude
By 1355 David II was still a prisoner but the French were pressing the Scottish nobles to take military action under the Auld Alliance, which stipulated that if either country were attacked by England, the other country would invade English territory. The Scots gathered an army on the border and the English mobilised in response. The French sent 50 or 60 men-at-arms under Yon de Garencières to Scotland. They also promised the Scots a large cash payment to be distributed among their elite if they would invade England. When this payment failed to arrive by late September a nine-month truce was agreed. A large part of the English force subsequently moved south to join Edward's planned campaign in northern France. The English military focus was very much on France, with Edward's son about to lead an attack in south-west France. Many members of the garrisons of the English border fortresses left their posts without permission in order to join Edward's expedition to France. These included the commander of the Berwick town garrison, William, Lord Greystoke.

A few days after the truce was signed the French cash, 40,000 gold , arrived. Waiting only until the departing English were well on their way the Scottish reneged on the treaty and invaded Northumberland in northern England. They were probably fewer than 2,000 strong, but there was no English field force to oppose them. The Constable of Norham Castle, a significant English border fortification, attempted to counter attack with part of his garrison and some locals, but this scratch force was routed. The Scots pillaged and burned villages across Northumbria. Edward received the news on 20 October, by which time much of his army was already in France and the balance was embarking. He continued with his campaign in France, where he led a chevauchée – a large-scale mounted raidacross Picardy, attempting to draw the French army into battle. The French evaded, prevaricated and avoided battle.

Fall and recapture of Berwick town

The Scottish nobles Thomas, Earl of Angus, and Patrick, Earl of March gathered a small force of Scots and French, and boats to transport them in. After training for six days they attacked Berwick town on 6 November, escalading the walls shortly before dawn. Overrunning the walls the Scots then pressed the short-handed garrison back through the town towards the castle. The English town garrison and the town's inhabitants took refuge in the castle, while the Scots looted the town. The castle was already strongly garrisoned and was promptly reinforced by John Coupland, who arrived with part of the English garrison of Roxburgh. The Guardian of Scotland, Robert Stewart, who was acting as regent for the imprisoned David II, took personal control of the siege of the castle. There was a fortified bridge from the town to the castle which was defended on the side closest the town (the east side) by a tower known as the Douglas tower. The English garrisons had held this against the initial Scottish attack, but it fell to a subsequent assault. The Scots then attempted to mine the castle's walls and launched further assaults against it.

Meanwhile the expedition in Picardy was proving inconclusive. Edward attempted to set up an arranged battle, but no agreement could be reached. According to some sources, during these discussions Edward received word of the fall of Berwick town and the siege of the castle; he cut short the negotiations and returned his army to England after receiving the news. According to other accounts it was not until he disembarked in England with the army on 12 November, after the negotiations with the French had failed, that he learnt of the fall of Berwick. In any event, Edward was in Newcastle in the north by Christmas Eve (24 December), where a large army was assembling, and a small fleet was being prepared to supply it. The army left Newcastle on 6 January 1356.

A force under Walter Mauny went ahead, escorting 120 miners. When they reached Berwick they found the castle was still holding out. Most of the original Scottish assault force had left, leaving a garrison in the town of 130 men, too few to adequately garrison the walls. The English laid siege to the town and the Scots could expect no relief force, according to a contemporary "by reason of the discord of the magnates". The miners tunnelled towards the town walls while Mauny prepared simultaneous land and sea assaults. On 13 January Edward arrived with the main English army. The Scots offered to parley and Edward agreed to let them leave, even allowing them to take what plunder they could carry.

Aftermath

Edward moved his army up the River Tweed to Roxburgh and on 26 January the English army set off towards Edinburgh, leaving a  trail of devastation behind them. The Scots practised a scorched earth policy, refusing battle and devastating their own territory, and poor weather prevented the English supply ships from linking up with the army. This caused Edward, after thoroughly devastating Lothian, to cut short the campaign and withdraw, arriving in Carlisle at the end of February with the army in poor condition.

Notes, citations and sources

Notes

Citations

Sources 

 
 
 
 
 
 
 
 
 
 
 
 
 
 
 
 
 
 
 

Berwick
Berwick
1355 in Scotland
Berwick